The 2004 Bandy World Championship was a competition between bandy playing nations. The men's tournament was played in Sweden on 1–8 February 2004 for Group A and Group B was played at the City Park Ice Rink in Hungary on 25–28 February 2004. Finland won the championship for the 1st time.  There were 11 bandy playing countries participating in the 2004 championships: Finland, Kazakhstan, Norway, Russia, Sweden (group A) and Belarus, Canada, Estonia, Hungary, Netherlands and United States (group B).

Results
Finland became champion. For the first time ever the championship went to a team other than Soviet Union/Russia or Sweden.

Group A

First round
 1 February
 Sweden–Kazakhstan 	14–2
 Russia–Norway 	6–3

 2 February
Kazakhstan–Russia 	3–10
Sweden–Finland 	7–1

 3 February
Finland–Norway 	5–3
Sweden–Russia 	4–3

 4 February
Kazakhstan–Norway 	4–4
Russia–Finland 	3–4

 5 February
Finland–Kazakhstan 	3–7
Sweden–Norway 	6–6

Final round

Semifinals
 7 February
 Sweden–Kazakhstan   10–3
 Russia–Finland 	3–4

Match for 3rd place
 8 February
 Russia–Kazakhstan 	5–2

Final
 8 February
 Sweden–Finland 	4–5 (aet)

Group B

First round
 25 February
 Canada–USA 	        3–4
 Hungary–Estonia  	2–3
 Belarus–Netherlands	7–0
 Estonia–Canada 	2–6
 Hungary–USA 	1–10

 26 February
 Belarus–Estonia  	2–1
 Netherlands–USA 	0–12
 Belarus–Canada 	3–2
 Estonia–USA 	0–10
 Hungary–Netherlands 4–1

 27 February
 Hungary–Belarus 	4–2
 Netherlands–Canada 	1–6
 Belarus–USA 	1–6
 Netherlands–Estonia 0–6
 Hungary–Canada 	3–3

Play-off matches

Match for 3rd place
28 February
Hungary–Canada 5–1

Final
28 February
USA–Belarus 7–0

References

2004
World Championship
Bandy World Championship
Bandy World Championship
International bandy competitions hosted by Sweden
International bandy competitions hosted by Hungary
Bandy World Championship